In Meitei religion and Meitei mythology, the Guardians of the Directions or  Maikei Ngaakpa Lai  refers to the deities who rule the specific directions of space according to Sanamahism.

There are mainly ten Guardians of the Directions in Meitei mythology. These are the following:

Development

According to Meitei mythology, before the creation of the universe, there were four deities who guard four realms. These are the following:

These four deities guardians guard the four main directions before the creation of the universe.

However, the following deities are also added to the guardianship of the directions after the creation of the universe:

Four main directions
 Ibudhou Marjing:- He is the Guardian of the North East direction.
 Thangjing:- He is the Guardian of the South West direction.
 Lainingthou Koubru:- He is the guardian of the North West direction.
 Wangbren:- He is the guardian of the South East direction.

See also
 Guardians of the directions, the Hindu equivalent.
 Norðri, Suðri, Austri and Vestri, the Norse equivalent.

References

External links
 India Through the Ages

Mythology
Sanamahism